Argyphia is a monotypic moth genus of the family Noctuidae described by Saalmuller in 1891. Its only species, Argyphia arcifera, was first described by Paul Mabille in 1881. It is found in Madagascar and the Comoros.

References

Catocalinae
Monotypic moth genera